Andrew McGee is the American former guitarist for God Lives Underwater. He currently plays guitar in Wired All Wrong.

References 

Living people
American rock guitarists
Year of birth missing (living people)
God Lives Underwater members
Place of birth missing (living people)